This article lists the episodes and short summaries of the final 25 episodes (the 119th to the 143rd episodes) of the  anime series, known in the English dub as the seventh and final season of Ranma ½ or "Ranma Forever".

Rumiko Takahashi's manga series Ranma ½ was adapted into two anime series: Ranma ½ which ran on Fuji TV for 18 episodes and Ranma ½ Nettōhen which ran for 143. The first TV series was canceled due to low ratings in September 1989, but was then brought back in December as the much more popular and much longer-running Ranma ½ Nettōhen. Correlating to the manga storylines, the anime adaptations, put together, go only as far as halfway into volume 22 (out of 38).

Viz Media licensed both anime for English dubs and labeled them as one. They released them in North America in seven DVD collections they call "seasons". Nettōhen episodes 119 to 143 are season 7, which was given the title "Ranma Forever".



Episode list

References
 Ranma ½ Perfect Edition Anime Episode Summaries

1992 Japanese television seasons
Season 7